Mäkelä is a surname originating in Finland (in Finnish, it means "hill farm"), where it is the fifth most common surname. Notable people with the surname include:

 Eero Mäkelä (1942–2008), Finnish chef, first Michelin-starred in Finland
 Hannu Mäkelä (writer) (born 1943), Finnish writer of children's books
 Hannu Mäkelä (athlete) (born 1949), Finnish sprinter
 Heikki Mäkelä (born 1946), Finnish sprint canoeist, Summer Olympics
 Ilkka Mäkelä (born 1963), Finnish football manager and former player
 Tomi Mäkelä (born 1964), Finnish-German musicologist
 Jani Mäkelä, Finnish politician
 Janne Mäkelä (born 1971), Finnish footballer
 Juho Mäkelä (born 1983), Finnish footballer
 Klaus Mäkelä (born 1996), Finnish conductor and cellist
 Mika Mäkelä (born 1971), Finnish judoka
 Mikko Mäkelä (born 1965), Finnish player of ice hockey
 Mikko Mäkelä (filmmaker), Finnish film director
 P. Scott Makela (1960–1999), Finnish-American graphic and type designer, AIGA medalist
 Satu Mäkelä-Nummela (born 1970), Finnish sports shooter
  (born 1948), Finnish hockey referee
 Tapio Mäkelä (1926–2016), Finnish cross-country skier
 Tatu Mäkelä (born 1988), Finnish footballer
 Toivo Mäkelä (1909–1979), Finnish film actor
 Tuukka Mäkelä, Finnish professional ice hockey defenceman
 Valle Mäkelä (born 1986), Finnish motor racing driver
 Wille Mäkelä (born 1974), Finnish curler, Olympic medalist

References

Finnish-language surnames